Dr. Randall Rossilli Jr. (born January 11, 1968) is media entrepreneur and educator.

Rossilli has been nominated for four Emmys, winning one in 2009. He has also won the New York International Film Festival for his contributions to the Social Documentary, Presumption of Guilt. He was the founder and President/CEO of Nightstand Creations, Inc. as well as Nightstand Studios and the Nightstand Music Group.  He is currently the teacher of Broadcast Journalism, and oversees PVTV for Passaic Valley Regional High School in Little Falls, NJ.

Early life
Rossilli was born January 11, 1968, in Clara Maas Hospital in Belleville, New Jersey, to Randall Rossilli, a self-employed entrepreneur who owned his own flooring business, and Patricia Rossilli, a legal secretary who would become a stay-at-home mom. Raised in Newark, New Jersey, Randy would be the oldest of the three children born to Randy and Patti.  When Randy was 3, his parents had his sister, Karen, and nearly four years later they had his younger brother, Michael.  At the age of 12, his parents moved him and his siblings from Newark, 15 miles outside of the city to East Hanover Township, New Jersey.  Although relatively poor, Rossilli’s parents paid for many years of guitar lessons.  He would continue his guitar studies into his college years.

Musical influences
Rossilli became interested in music at an early age and attributes his decision to take guitar lessons to seeing Harry Chapin perform on a popular children’s show, Wonderama, hosted by Bob McAllister.  Chapin’s storytelling style and social conscience still drive him today.  In addition to Chapin, his style and interests as a producer and music have been shaped by a diverse collection of artists varying from singer songwriters like Billy Joel, Bruce Springsteen, and James Taylor, to the horn-driven Rock and Funk sounds of Huey Lewis and the News and Earth Wind and Fire, to a wide collection of country and R&B artists.  He has released more than 25 songs on Apple's iTunes internationally (2)

Education
Rossilli attended Hanover Park High School and graduated in 1986. In high school, he became involved in the theater and music programs.  He received his BA in communication - radio/television/audio production from William Paterson University, where he met his wife, Jenny, who was studying to be a speech pathologist. Eventually he went back to school to become a teacher and later received his master's degree in education and administration from Seton Hall University. Ultimately, Randy earned his Doctorate in Educational Leadership from Northcentral University.

Education career
Rossilli spent four years as a middle school English and social studies teacher before being asked to become a supervisor, building principal and later district-level director.  He initially left education to work his media craft full-time, and returned for one year as principal of a small private hearing-impaired school, while his production facilities, Nightstand Studios, were being built.

During his career in education he was named one of the Top-25 Technology Educators in North America by being awarded the Apple Distinguished Educator Award.

In 2017, Rossilli decided to return to the classroom, accepting a position to teach high school broadcast journalism at Passaic Valley High School, in Little Falls, New Jersey.

Since July 2019, Rossilli has been principal at Celebrate the Children School in Denville, New Jersey.  Celebrate the Children is a premier school for children with autism and alternative learning needs. It employs the unique, relationship-based DIR/Floortime™ model to engage children in social-emotional growth, while ensuring they also receive their state-required academic mandates.

Rossilli is also an adjunct professor of media at the County College of Morris in Randolph, NJ.

Critical success
Rossilli has been nominated for four Emmy Awards - three Mid-Atlantic Emmy Awards as Director, Producer (2010 December Miracles) (3) and for Outstanding Programming, and he won the 2009 Mid-Atlantic Emmy award for Outstanding Program or special for Children/Youth/Teens for the pilot of his property The Adventures of Young Thomas Edison, (1) (4)  for which is wrote, directed, composed and performed the music, edited, and designed the puppet and animated characters, as well as lending his voice to a handful of characters.  Subsequently, he was nominated for a New York Emmy for Outstanding Music Composition for his public television special Lil’ Grusome and the Nutshell Gang.

In addition to these productions, he also was recognized at the New York International Film Festival for his work as editor and co-producer of the Social Documentary Presumption of Guilt.

Business endeavors and personal life

From 2016-2017, Rossilli consulted with MJH Associates in Cranbury, NJ.  As their Director of Studio Operations and New Media, he helped design, build, and roll out their multimillion-dollar in-house television and recording studios. 
Rossilli runs Nightstand Studios and Nightstand Creations, Inc. in Fairfield, New Jersey. He is married, has two children, and lives in Livingston, New Jersey.

References and links
 
 Randy Rossilli, Jr. on iTunes
 The Animator of Verona
 Emmy Nominations for Verona Animator
 2008 Mid-Atlantic Emmy Recipients
 Nightstand Studios/Nightstand Creations
 Detailed Interview and Bio of Randy Rossilli, Jr. - Circle Magazine

References

Educators from New Jersey
Hanover Park High School alumni
People from Belleville, New Jersey
People from East Hanover, New Jersey
People from Newark, New Jersey
William Paterson University alumni
Seton Hall University alumni
American chief executives
Emmy Award winners
Living people
1968 births